The Rapid Radiative Transfer Model (RRTM) is a simulation for the flow of electromagnetic radiation in and out of the Earth. It is a validated, correlated k-distribution band model for the calculation of solar and thermal-infrared atmospheric radiative fluxes and heating rates.  The Rapid Radiative Transfer Model for GCMs (RRTM-G) is an accelerated version of RRTM that provides improved efficiency with minimal loss of accuracy for application to general circulation models. The latter divides the solar spectrum into 14 bands within which a total of 112 pseudo-monochromatic calculations are performed, and in the thermal infrared 16 bands are used within which 140 pseudo-monochromatic calculations are performed. RRTM-G is used in a number of general circulation models worldwide, such as that of the European Centre for Medium-Range Weather Forecasts.

See also
List of atmospheric radiative transfer codes
Atmospheric radiative transfer codes

References

Clough, S. A., M. W. Shephard, E. J. Mlawer, J. S. Delamere, M. J. Iacono, K. Cady-Pereira, S. Boukabara, and P. D. Brown, Atmospheric radiative transfer modeling: a summary of the AER codes, Short Communication, J. Quant. Spectrosc. Radiat. Transfer, 91, 233–244, 2005.
Mlawer, E.J., S.J. Taubman, P.D. Brown,  M.J. Iacono and S.A. Clough: RRTM, a validated correlated-k model for the longwave. J. Geophys. Res., 102, 16,663-16,682, 1997.

External links
 http://rtweb.aer.com AER radiative transfer model web site

Atmospheric radiative transfer codes